John Francis Sherrington (born 5 January 1958) is an auxiliary bishop of the Diocese of Westminster. His appointment was announced on 30 June 2011. He had previously served as part of the clergy of the Diocese of Nottingham.

Biography

John Sherrington was born in Leicester in 1958 to Frank and Catherine Sherrington, and has one brother. He attended St Thomas More Roman Catholic Primary School and Wyggeston Grammar School for Boys, both in Leicester. After his secondary education he attended Queens' College, Cambridge obtaining his Masters in Mathematics. He later worked as a computer specialist for Arthur Anderson Management Consultants. He began his ecclesiastical studies at All Hallows College, Dublin, earning a Bachelor of Arts. He was ordained a priest for the diocese of Nottingham on 13 June 1987. He earned a licentiate in moral theology from the Pontifical Gregorian University in Rome (1988–1990).

Later he held the following pastoral assignments: Parochial Vicar at St Anne’s in Radcliffe on Trent (1987–1988), Professor of Moral Theology at All Hallows College (1990–98), Professor of Moral Theology and Director of Studies at the inter-diocesan seminary in Wonersh (1998–2004), Parish Priest of Our Lady of Lourdes, Mickleover, Derbyshire (2004–09). From 2009-11 he was Parish Priest of the Church of the Good Shepherd, Arnold, Nottingham. At the same time he held the office of President of the Diocesan Commission for Marriage and Family Life and he has been a Consultor of the Catholic Bishops' Conference of England and Wales on issues of morality.

On 30 June 2011, Sherrington was appointed an auxiliary bishop of Westminster and titular bishop of Hilta by Pope Benedict XVI. He received his episcopal consecration on the following 14 September from Archbishop Vincent Nichols. From 2011 to 2016 he had oversight of the deaneries of Hertfordshire, and since then has had oversight of the deaneries of North London.

References

External links

Bishop Sherrington profile

1958 births
Living people
People educated at Wyggeston Grammar School for Boys
21st-century Roman Catholic bishops in England
21st-century Roman Catholic titular bishops
Alumni of All Hallows College, Dublin
Pontifical Gregorian University alumni
People from Leicester
Alumni of Queens' College, Cambridge